Khadjibey was a fortress and a haven by the Gulf of Odesa, in the location of the modern city of Odesa, Ukraine. Other known spellings include Khadzhibey, Khadjibei, Hajibey, Khacdjibei, Hacıbey, Hocabey, Gadzhibei, Chadžibėjus, Codjabey, Kachybey, Kotsiubey, Kotsiubiiv.  

By one hypothesis, it was named after Hacı I Giray.

Nadler suggested that a Tatar settlement existed on the site by 14th century but was ceded in the early 15th century to the Grand Duchy of Lithuania. An early mention of a  "port Kaczubyeiow" dated by 1415 is given by Jan Długosz in his Historiae Polonicae. However it is argued that Długosz erred and the described events (gifting grain by king Władysław II Jagiełło to besieged Constantinople) are reliably documented to be happened in 1413.

In 1480 the fortress was captured by the Ottoman Empire. In 1764 the Ottomans reinforced their position by building the Yeni Dünya fortress nearby; it was included in the province of Silistra Eyalet. In 1789, during the Russo-Turkish War, the Russian army took the fortress and settlement and in 1792 and the territory was transferred to the Russian Empire.

See also 
Khadzhibey Estuary

References 

History of Odesa
Ottoman fortifications
Former forts
Forts in Ukraine
Buildings and structures completed in the 14th century
Yedisan